Rockstar Interactive India LLP (trade name: Rockstar India) is an Indian video game developer and a studio of Rockstar Games based in Bangalore. The company was established in August 2016 and is led by studio director Daniel Smith. It absorbed Dhruva Interactive, India's oldest game developer, in May 2019.

History 
Prior to the creation of Rockstar India, Rockstar Games had collaborated with Technicolor India, the Bangalore studio of Technicolor SA, on games like Red Dead Redemption (2010), L.A. Noire (2011), and Max Payne 3 (2012). In October 2012, Technicolor and Rockstar Games announced the opening of the "Rockstar Dedicated Unit" within Technicolor India, which was to size around 80–90 people and work solely on Rockstar Games' products. Around August 2016, Rockstar Games established Rockstar India as an internal studio in Bangalore. Daniel Smith was installed as the studio manager. The studio was part of the development team on Red Dead Redemption 2, which was released in October 2018. Dhruva Interactive's team of 300 people was to be integrated with Rockstar India, which had grown to approximately 500 employees by this time. The acquisition was completed later that month.

Games developed

References 

2016 establishments in Karnataka
Companies based in Bangalore
Indian companies established in 2016
Indian subsidiaries of foreign companies
Rockstar Games subsidiaries
Take-Two Interactive divisions and subsidiaries
Video game companies established in 2016
Video game companies of India
Video game development companies